The Treaty of Varkiza (also known as the Varkiza Pact or the Varkiza Peace Agreement) was signed in Varkiza (near Athens) on February 12, 1945 between the Greek Minister of Foreign Affairs and the Secretary of the Communist Party of Greece (KKE) for EAM-ELAS, following the latter's defeat during the Dekemvriana clashes. One of the aspects of the accord (Article IX) called for a plebiscite to be held within the year in order to resolve any problems with the Greek Constitution. This plebiscite would help establish elections and thus create a constituent assembly that would draft a new organic law. In another aspect of the treaty, both signatories agreed that the Allies send overseers in order to verify the validity of the elections. The accord also promised that members of the EAM-ELAS would be permitted to participate in political activities if they surrendered their weapons. Moreover, all civil and political liberties would be guaranteed along with the undertaking by the Greek government towards establishing a nonpolitical national army.

Disarmament

The treaty specified the disarmament of EAM-ELAS, which, according to records, surrendered within the next few days or weeks 100 artillery of various types, 81 heavy mortars, 138 light mortars, 419 machine guns, 1412 submachine guns, 713 automatic rifles, 48,973 rifles and pistols, 57 antitank rifles and 17 radios.

However, the real numbers are higher, as receipts for weapons were sometimes refused. Panagiotis Koumoukelis relates in 'All That Grief' that he refused a receipt for his gun and that since he could not produce his receipt, he was tortured by members of the Security Battalions.

Aftermath
Ultimately, the promises enshrined in the Treaty of Varkiza were not upheld. The main problem was that the treaty gave amnesty only for political reasons, but many of the actions by communists during the Dekemvriana were viewed as nonpolitical. After the signing of the treaty, there was widespread persecution of communists and former EAM members and supporters. This period, immediately prior to the outbreak of the Greek Civil War, was known as the White Terror (Greece) (1945-46). 

The Communist Party of Greece remained legal during the Greek Civil War until 27 December 1947.

Negotiators

See also
List of treaties

References

Sources
Xydis, Stephen G. "Greece and the Yalta Declaration." American Slavic and East European Review. Vol. 20, No. 1, (February 1961), pp. 6–24.
Stavrianos, L. S. and Panagopoulos, E. P. "Present-Day Greece." The Journal of Modern History. Vol. 20, No. 2, (June 1948), pp. 149–158.
 C.M. Woodhouse "The Apple of Discord: A Survey of Recent Greek Politics in their International Setting (London 1948)308-310 
+ Richter, Heinz "British Intervention in Greece, From Varkiza to Civil War February 1945 to August 1946" (London 1986)

1945 in Greece
Peace treaties of Greece
Treaties concluded in 1945
Treaties of the Kingdom of Greece
Greek Civil War
Communist Party of Greece
National Liberation Front (Greece)
Vari-Voula-Vouliagmeni
1940s in Greek politics
February 1945 events in Europe